Hants East Rural High (HERH) is a Canadian high school located in Milford Station, Nova Scotia.

The school was opened in 1957 and is administratively part of the Chignecto-Central Regional School Board.  One of its feeder schools is Riverside Education Centre, also in Milford Station. Notable alumni include: musical artist Classified, athlete Tracy Cameron, professional wrestler Lincoln Steen, and Kerr Baillie.

Approximately 1,000 students attend the school, which includes grades 9 through 12.

References

External links
HERH Official Web Site
Chignecto-Central Regional School Board

High schools in Nova Scotia
Schools in Hants County, Nova Scotia